Leander J. "Lee" Foley (February 14, 1885 – February 9, 1966) was an American football player and coach.  Foley was the ninth head football coach at Marquette University in Milwaukee, Wisconsin and he held that position for the 1913 season.  His coaching record at Marquette was 4–3–1.  Foley later became an obstetrician and gynecologist in Wauwatosa, Wisconsin.

Head coaching record

References

1885 births
1966 deaths
American football ends
American gynecologists
American obstetricians
Marquette Golden Avalanche football coaches
Marquette Golden Avalanche football players
People from Sheboygan County, Wisconsin
People from Wauwatosa, Wisconsin
Physicians from Wisconsin
Women gynaecologists